List of Lebanese monuments

 Beit ed-Dine
 Jubeil
 Baalbeck
 Saida Castle
 Downtown Beirut
 Harissa
 Batroun
 Jeita Grotto
 Youssef Bey Karam Statue at St Georges Cathedral Ehden

References

Monuments and memorials in Lebanon
Monuments